The Alaska Native Arts Foundation (in operation 2002–2016) was a non-profit organization formed to support the Alaska Native art community. Its mission was focused on economic development to create fairly-priced markets for Alaska Native art as well as to provide general awareness and public education of Alaska's indigenous cultures, and as a result offered programs to support Alaskan Native artists. Funded by a combination of government grants and private funding in the form of donations from Alaskan Native corporations, the organization distributed grant money through project support programs to provide in-residence art programs, educational programs for rural schools, funding for museum demonstrations, art workshops, and exhibitions and documentation of native artists' work.

Curation of Native Works 
The Native Arts Foundation gallery in Anchorage, which opened in 2006 presented and curated the works of Native artists, including visual art, spoken word, performance art and choreography, dance, fashion, and video, as well as presenting works created during privately organized workshops and business training. Outside of Alaska, the foundation also promoted Alaskan Native art at events and festivals in Pittsburgh, Washington D.C., Paris, and Miami.

In addition, the Foundation maintained extensive inventory of Native art and utilitarian handmade items of all sorts, based on the "subsistence" lifestyle of their makers: walrus ivory carvings, baleen etchings and baskets, whalebone sculpture, salmon and halibut skin baskets, fish skin crafts, caribou antler dolls dressed in traditional sealskin clothing, bronze sculpture and oil and acrylic paintings; and wearable art and accessories: jewelry, carved masks, traditional "ulu" knives, traditional mukluks made using natural material, summer parkas, beaded gowns using quills and moose hide, bolo ties, walrus whisker earrings, "scrimshaw" belt buckles, and silver, gold and copper jewelry.

Closure 
The Foundation was dissolved in the spring of 2016 as the result of lost state funding and low markups on sold art. At the time of closure, the stock of the Foundation gallery was made available for private sale, and services were phased out to accommodate future marketing efforts. As operations ceased, the Foundation sought to distribute its intellectual property and valuable items to another organization.

References

2002 establishments in Alaska
Alaska Native culture in Anchorage
Alaska Native organizations
Arts organizations established in 2002
Native American arts organizations
Non-profit organizations based in Anchorage, Alaska